Lake Davis may refer to:

Lake Davis, a reservoir in Plumas County, California
Lake Davis, California, a census-designated place in Plumas County

See also
Davis Lake (disambiguation)